The cloudy-winged miner bee (Andrena nubecula) is a species of miner bee in the family Andrenidae. It is found in Central America and North America.

References

Further reading

External links

 

nubecula
Articles created by Qbugbot
Insects described in 1853